HMS Greyhound was a Hawthorn Leslie three-funnel, 30 knot destroyer ordered by the Royal Navy under the 1898 – 1899 Naval Estimates.

Construction and career
She was laid down as builder's number 377 on 18 July 1899, at the R.W. Hawthorn Leslie and Company shipyard at Hebburn-on-Tyne and launched on 6 October 1900. During her builder's trials she made her contract speed of 30 knots. She was completed and accepted by the Royal Navy in January 1902, at a total cost of £61,066. Greyhound was assigned to the Channel Fleet on her commission. She spent her operational career mainly in Home Waters operating with the Channel Fleet in the East Coast Flotilla.

On 30 August 1912, the Admiralty directed all destroyer classes were to be designated by letters starting with 'A'.  Since her design speed was 30-knots and she had three funnels she was assigned to the C class.  After 30 September 1913, she was known as a C-class destroyer and had the letter ‘C’ painted on the hull below the bridge area and on either the fore or aft funnel.

World War I
July 1914, found her in the 6th Destroyer Flotilla tendered to  based at Dover. While employed in the 6th Flotilla she performed anti-submarine and counter mining patrols as well as Dover Barrage defensive patrols. In November 1916, she was redeployed to the 7th Destroyer Flotilla on the Humber performing anti-submarine patrols and counter-mining operations off the East Coast of England until the Armistice. She was awarded the battle honour "Belgian Coast 1915 – 18".

By November 1918, she was paid off and placed in reserve awaiting disposal. She was sold on 10 June 1919, to Clarkeson of Whitby for breaking.

Pennant numbers

Citations

Bibliography
 
 
 
 
 
 
 
 

 

Ships built on the River Tyne
1900 ships
C-class destroyers (1913)
World War I destroyers of the United Kingdom
Greyhound-class destroyers